The Emblem of Nepal is the national emblem of Nepal and is used by the Government of Nepal and many government agencies. On 13 June 2020, the emblem was revised to include the newly issued map which includes Nepalese claims to the Kalapani territory and Lipulekh Pass.

Features
It contains the flag of Nepal, Mount Everest, green hills symbolising the hilly regions of Nepal and yellow colour symbolising the fertile Terai region, male and female hands joining to symbolise gender equality, and a garland of Rhododendron (the national flower) also called Guraash (गूराश). Atop this is a white silhouette in the shape of Nepal.

Motto

At the base of the design a red scroll carries the national motto in Sanskrit: जननी जन्मभूमिश्च स्वर्गादपी गरीयसी (jananī janmabhūmiśca svargādapi garīyasī), which translates as "Mother and Motherland are greater than heaven."

The phrase:

In English:
I care not for Lanka, Lakshmana, even though it be made of gold.
One's mother and one's native land are worth more even than heaven.

It was quoted by Rama when his brother Lakshmana expresses desire to stay back in Lanka.

Historical arms
Before 28 May 2008, the modern emblem was preceded by a coat of arms, generally consisting of a white cow, a green pheasant (Himalayan monal), two Gurkha soldiers (one carrying a kukri and a bow, and the other a rifle), peaks of the Himalayas, two crossed Nepalese flags and kukris, the footprints of Gorakhnath (the guardian deity of the Gurkhas) and the royal headdress. It also contained the same red scroll with the national motto. From 1935 to 1962, the arms also bore the secondary Latin motto, "Dulce et decorum est pro patria mori".

Subnational emblems
Nepal is divided into seven provinces, each of which have adopted a distinctive emblem.

See also

Flag of Nepal
Largest Human Flag of Nepal
Janani Janmabhumishcha Swargadapi Gariyasi

References

External links
Infos at indianest.com (archived 17 March 2006)

Coat of arms
Nepal
Nepal
Nepal
Nepal
Nepal